"Because I Love You" is a song by Swedish singer September from her third studio album Dancing Shoes (2007). It was released on 26 November 2008 as a promotional single for September's compilation album Gold.  The single was also released in the Netherlands, on 13 July 2009, to promote her compilation album Dancing in Orbit.

Track listing
Scandinavian CD single and digital download
 "Because I Love You" (Radio Edit) – 3:18
 "Because I Love You" (Dave Ramone Radio Edit) – 2:46
 "Because I Love You" (Radio Extended) – 5:37
 "Because I Love You" (Clubmix Short) – 3:48
 "Because I Love You" (Clubmix Extended) – 5:44
 "Because I Love You" (Dave Ramone Extended) – 5:33
 "Because I Love You" (Jazzy Candlelight) – 3:52

Charts

Release history

References

2008 singles
Petra Marklund songs
Songs written by Jonas von der Burg
Songs written by Niklas von der Burg
Songs written by Anoo Bhagavan
2007 songs